Luis Arriaga (born January 26, 2001) is an American soccer player who currently plays as a midfielder for North Carolina FC in USL League One.

Professional career
Arriaga signed with Real Salt Lake on November 28, 2018, ahead of the 2019 season. He was released by Salt Lake following their 2020 season.

On March 11, 2021, Arriaga joined North Carolina FC in USL League One.

Personal life
Born in the United States, Arriaga is of Mexican descent.

References

External links

2001 births
Living people
American soccer players
American sportspeople of Mexican descent
Association football midfielders
Homegrown Players (MLS)
Major League Soccer players
North Carolina FC players
Real Salt Lake players
Real Monarchs players
Soccer players from California
Sportspeople from Santa Rosa, California
USL Championship players